Dioctria is a genus of robber fly classified in the subfamily Dasypogoninae in the family Asilidae. Together with the genus Bohartia, Dicolonus, Echthodopa, Eudioctria and Metadioctria it forms the tribe Dioctriini.

Species
Species include:

Gallery

References

 Catalogue of Life
 BioLib — Dioctria

Asilidae genera
Articles containing video clips
Asilidae